Frank Gerard Lloyd (born 1928
-15 December 1995, Sydney, Australia) credited briefly as Frank Maxwell was an Australian actor in a career spanning five decades starting from the early 1940s, Lloyd worked in all sectors of the genre, he appeared in radio plays, theatre, television and film. He also served a script translator and dubber of international stage and film, He served in Moscow International Ministry of the Arts

He was perhaps best known for his brief 15-month stint in TV series Home and Away  in 1988, as one of 16 original characters, in the role of retired carnival worker Neville McPhee, appearing in the first 109 episodes, opposite Sheila Kennelly who played his wife Floss, both actors where subsequently written out of the serries, with producers stating they wanted to focus more on a younger cast and updated formula.Lloyd died suddenly of unknown causes (or be it un-stipulated causes) in December 1995, aged 67, and his obituary was published in several Sydney newspapers, though never mentioned in any mainstream media, and it was thought until the late 2010's that he may still be living, then aged in his late 80s, though his whereabouts where unknown

Biography

Lloyd's first roles stemmed from his after-school job as an office boy at Sydney's radio station 2GB, where he was sometimes asked to appear in radio plays. After finishing school, Lloyd travelled to England, and studied theatre. He appeared in the New York stage production of The Drunkard. 

He subsequently travelled to England, and whilst in the United Kingdom when had small roles in the films Let Us Be True in 1953 and The Battle of the River Plate in 1956. He later played small roles in Australian films including Mr Tinkle in Around the World in Eighty Ways, Those Dear Departed and Fast Talking.. Lloyd was also sometimes asked to translate, dub or edit theatre/film scripts of international productions.

Lloyd is probably best known for his many guest character roles in television in both soap opera's,  and serials and telemovies with parts in The Young Doctors as (Ted Wilcox), Prisoner, Sons and Daughters, and A Country Practice, he also had guest roles on sitcoms including Mother and Son and Boys from the Bush, with his work in soap opera providing some notable exceptions, Lloyd's career was mainly confined to 

However he worked regularly in theatres throughout his career, including playing including productions of Twelfth Night, Othello, The Wizard of Oz, The Man of La Mancha, Annie, The Diary of Anne Frank and a year-long role in a production of Guys and Dolls.''

Lloyd was badly injured in a car crash, in Greece alongside Canadian actor and musician Donald Harvie (1929–2011) in 1963.

He died in Potts Point, New South Wales, on 15 December 1995 from unspecified causes.

Filmography

References

External links 
 
 Frank Lloyd biography on backtothebay.net

Australian male television actors
Australian male stage actors
20th-century Australian male actors
Australian male radio actors
1995 deaths
1928 births